Century  is a 1993 British film, written and directed by playwright Stephen Poliakoff.

Clive Owen stars as a 19th-century Jewish doctor who, while studying at a research institute, discovers that an authoritative doctor (played by Charles Dance) is sterilizing innocent women. This features Mark Strong in his debut as a minor role.

Cast
Charles Dance as Professor Mandry
Clive Owen as Paul Reisner
Miranda Richardson as Clara
Robert Stephens as Mr Reisner
Joan Hickson as Mrs Whitweather
Lena Headey as Miriam
Neil Stuke as Felix
Joseph Bennett as Edwin
Fiona Walker as Mrs. Pritchard
Ian Shaw as Meredith
Mark Strong as Policeman

External links

Century (1993 movie)
Films directed by Stephen Poliakoff
1993 drama films
Sterilization in fiction
British drama films
1990s English-language films
1990s British films
English-language drama films